Elmo Hood (born Elliot Nicholas Hood) is a British contemporary artist. He works in abstraction, pop art and collage.

Self-taught, Hood used painting as a coping mechanism for grief following a family bereavement in 2011, something he has spoken about in media interviews. He rose to public prominence in 2013, when a collage of two playing cards The Queen of Hearts went viral. The work was shared on the social media pages of music artists Sean Combs, The Game, Keyshia Cole and Example (musician). The artwork was also used for the stage set on Mary J Blige and Maxwell’s King and Queen of Hearts World Tour.

Hood's has exhibited artwork in the galleries in London, Paris, New York, Ibiza and Munich as well as having his work auctioned off at the Houses of Parliament. In 2013 he was commissioned to paint a series of murals for the Teenage Cancer Trust at Southampton General Hospital.

Hood's work has also appeared on the pages of GQ (magazine), and in US Glamour Magazine.

Notable works
In 2016 Hood exhibited Down the Rabbit Hole, with playing cards featuring prominently.

References

British contemporary artists
Living people
British male artists
Year of birth missing (living people)